Jani Valdemar Lehtonen (11 August 1968, in Mäntsälä – 22 December 2008, in Tampere) was a Finnish pole vaulter.

He finished eleventh at the 1990 European Championships, eighth at the 1992 European Indoor Championships and fifth at the 1993 World Indoor Championships,

His personal best vault was 5.82 metres, achieved in June 1993 in Kuortane. This is the current Finnish record. Lehtonen committed suicide in 2008.

References

External links

1968 births
2008 suicides
People from Mäntsälä
Finnish male pole vaulters
Athletes (track and field) at the 1992 Summer Olympics
Olympic athletes of Finland
Suicides in Finland
Sportspeople from Uusimaa